Ivan Chodák (3 February 1914 in Dolný Kubín – 14 February 1994 in Bratislava) was a Slovak footballer, coach and doctor of medicine.

He was an excellent sportsman and at the same time, he was one of the best students of the Faculty of Medicine, Comenius University in Bratislava. He took a doctor degree in 1938. He was one of the most famous and visited doctors in Bratislava specialised in otorhinolaryngology. People called him for many years "Mayor from Orava" in Bratislava.

He was well-known also due to his football skills and gentleman sports behaving. He began his footballing career for Dolný Kubín. At the beginning of the year 1935 he temporarily played for FC Vrútky and in autumn he took place for while in VS Bratislava. He played his first league match in club colors of the 1. ČsSK Bratislava, on 1 December 1935 against Teplitzer FK. He took part in 193 league matches and scored 23 goals. Apart from being a goalkeeper he experienced all player's posts. As a representative of Slovakia he showed the richness of his football skills eleven times. He finished his active football career in 1946. Due to his fair-play attitudes towards games, playmates, referees, spectators, but most of all towards his rivals he had a nickname "Knight in Football Boots". He was never sent off or even reprimanded during match.

Besides football he was practicing other sports. For VS Bratislava he took part in running races from 800m to 5000m, he also practiced high jump. He played tennis and he was an excellent swimmer. In 1934 he achieved an academic champion title of Czechoslovakia in cross-country skiing, which was a pass to Academic World Winter Games in Swiss St. Moritz. He reached a third place in 18 km running race

. As a student he played ice-hockey for VS Bratislava and SK Bratislava. He was a champion of Slovakia and he played in finals two times. He was in selected players team three times. When Hilda Múdra, who was notable for training the Olympic gold medallist Ondrej Nepela, came to Bratislava, he was her first sparring partner in figure skating. Over 25 years he was coach of all Slovan teams – from A-team, through junior teams, to un-registered players.

Since 1994, SFZ announced every year in February "The Dr. Ivan Chodak Fair Play Prize". The place of awarding ceremony is Dolny Kubín. Football stadium in Dolný Kubín also bears his name.

References 

 Július Psotka mladší: MUDr. Ivan Chodák, rytier v kopačkách. Šport press Bratislava 1999, .
 Zdenka Lenetayová: Šport a osobnosti / Sport and Personalities. SZTK – Museum of Physical Culture in Slovak Republic, Bratislava 2008. 
 Zdenka Letenayová, Viliam Karácsony: "Ivan Chodák". SZTK – Museum of Physical Culture in Slovak Republic, Bratislava 2014.

External links

Slovak National Sport Encyclopedia
UEFA.com

Ivan Chodák – Football Player Representing Fair Play

1914 births
1994 deaths
People from Dolný Kubín
Sportspeople from the Žilina Region
Slovak football managers
Slovak footballers
ŠK Slovan Bratislava managers
ŠK Slovan Bratislava players
Association football midfielders
Slovakia international footballers
Slovak figure skaters
Slovak cross-country skiers
Czechoslovak football managers